Paleopneustidae is a family of echinoderms belonging to the order Spatangoida.

Genera:
 Paleopneustes Agassiz, 1873
 Peripatagus Koehler, 1895
 Plesiozonus de Meijere, 1903

References

Spatangoida